King's Wood and Urchin Wood SSSI is a 128.1 hectare biological Site of Special Scientific Interest near the villages of Cleeve and Congresbury, North Somerset, notified in 1990.

The site has long been renowned for its botanical interest and records date back to the County Flora of 1893. The woodland supports a particularly high diversity of vascular plants, including populations of the nationally rare plant Purple Gromwell (Lithospermum purpurocaeruleum) and the scarce Angular Solomon's seal (Polygonatum odoratum).

Large areas of King's Wood were replanted during the 1960s with beech Fagus sylvatica and a variety of conifer species including Douglas fir (Pseudotsuga menziesii), Lawson's cypress (Chamaecyparis lawsoniana) and Norway spruce (Picea abies) . These crop trees have, however, largely been unsuccessful and the replanted areas are now being overtaken by hardwoods.

King's Wood supports nationally important populations of the rare and endangered greater horseshoe bat (Rhinolophus ferrumequinum) and dormice (Muscardinus avellanarius), and a nationally scarce Chrysomelid beetle (Clytra quadripunctata).

References

Sites of Special Scientific Interest in North Somerset
Sites of Special Scientific Interest notified in 1990
Forests and woodlands of Somerset
Woodland Sites of Special Scientific Interest